This is a list of English football transfers for the 2008–09 winter transfer window. Only moves featuring at least one Premier League or Championship club are listed.

The winter transfer window opened on 1 January 2009, although a few transfers took place prior to that date. The window was originally going to close at 00:00 on 1 February 2009, but it was extended to 17:00 on 2 February 2009 because 31 January fell on a Saturday. However, due to snowy conditions, the Premier League allowed some transfers to be completed after that time, provided that the clubs involved could prove that a deal had been agreed in principle and that the snow had caused the delay in the transfer. Players without a club may join one at any time, either during or in between transfer windows. Clubs below Premiership level may also sign players on loan at any time. If need be, clubs may sign a goalkeeper on an emergency loan, if all others are unavailable.

Transfers

 Player officially joined his new club on 1 January 2009.

Notes and references

Transfers Winter 2008-09
Winter 2008-09
English